Aiga Grabuste (born 24 March 1988, in Rēzekne) is a Latvian track and field athlete competing in heptathlon. She represented her country at the 2008 Beijing Olympics and won bronze medal at the 2012 European Athletics Championships, finishing just 10 points behind fellow Latvian Laura Ikauniece.

She set a then personal best of 6396 points at the 2009 European Athletics U23 Championships in Kaunas, winning the gold medal. Grabuste was also the 2007 European Junior champion in heptathlon.

In the indoor women's pentathlon, she was eighth at the 2010 IAAF World Indoor Championships and tenth at the 2011 European Athletics Indoor Championships. At the TNT - Fortuna Meeting in 2011 she set bests in the 200 metres, long jump and 800 metres events to take third overall with a score of 6252 points.

Achievements

Personal bests

Heptathlon

Pentathlon

References

External links 

 
 

1988 births
Living people
Latvian heptathletes
People from Rēzekne
Athletes (track and field) at the 2008 Summer Olympics
Athletes (track and field) at the 2012 Summer Olympics
Olympic athletes of Latvia
World Athletics Championships athletes for Latvia
European Athletics Championships medalists
University of Latvia alumni